Axis: Bold as Love is the second studio album by the Jimi Hendrix Experience. The album was first released by Track Records in the United Kingdom on December 1, 1967, only seven months after the release of the group's highly successful debut, Are You Experienced.  In the United States, Reprise Records delayed the release until the following month. The album reached the top ten in the album charts in both countries.

For the album, the group displayed several musical styles and critics saw it as demonstrating Jimi Hendrix's growth as a songwriter. The album introduced "Spanish Castle Magic" and "Little Wing", two Hendrix compositions which draw on his roots performing with rhythm and blues bands, that would remain in his live repertoire throughout his career.

The album was quite successful and was certified platinum in the US and silver in the UK. In 2000, Axis: Bold as Love was voted number 147 in Colin Larkin's All Time Top 1000 Albums (2000). Rolling Stone ranked Axis: Bold as Love number 92 on its 2020 list of the 500 Greatest Albums of All Time.

The album cover, which draws on Hindu religious iconography, has generated controversy. It was designed without Hendrix's approval, and he publicly expressed his dissatisfaction.

Recording
Following the completion of Are You Experienced at the end of April 1967, the Jimi Hendrix Experience continued their schedule of regular recording sessions, returning to Olympic Studios in London on May 4, to begin composing material for a follow-up LP. With Chas Chandler as producer, Eddie Kramer as engineer, and George Chkiantz as second engineer, the band started the session by working on a Noel Redding original that he had written about hippies, titled "She's So Fine". It featured background vocals by Hendrix and Mitch Mitchell; Redding later recalled that Hendrix was enthusiastic to record the song because it was written in A with an open G chord that he enjoyed playing. They achieved a working master on the 23rd take, on which Redding overdubbed his lead vocal. The band also made initial recordings of what would become "If 6 Was 9", using the working titles of "Section A" and "Section B" to identify its two distinct segments. During a session the following day, Hendrix and Mitchell improved "Section B", now titled "Symphony of Experience", by re-recording most of their guitar and drum parts. A reduction mix prepared by Kramer made room for additional overdubs, including Hendrix's lead vocal, backing vocals, and a percussion effect created by Chandler, Hendrix, and guests Graham Nash and Gary Leeds stamping their feet on a drum riser. As an additional oddity, Hendrix played a recorder on the track, achieving what they considered a satisfactory sound despite his complete lack of formal training with the instrument. Also recorded during these sessions was the experimental track "EXP". In the span of two days, the group recorded basic tracks for seven compositions, though only three were included on the album.

On May 9, the Experience reconvened at Olympic with Chandler, Kramer and Chkiantz. Hendrix had been curious about a harpsichord that was stored in the facility's Studio A, so on this day he sat at the instrument and began writing "Burning of the Midnight Lamp", a song that became the fourth UK single for the Experience. Hendrix attempted four takes before stopping for the day, producing a rough demo that was approximately a minute and a half in length. On May 10, the band performed their latest single, "The Wind Cries Mary", on the BBC television program Top of the Pops.

After a month-long break from the studio while playing gigs in Europe, the Experience returned to Olympic on June 5. They devoted the session to a new Hendrix song titled "Cat Talking to Me", recording 17 takes before deciding that the second was the superior version, to which they added guitar and percussion overdubs after Kramer prepared a reduction mix. It was later included on the posthumous album West Coast Seattle Boy: The Jimi Hendrix Anthology (2010).

On June 18, 1967, the Experience made its U.S. debut at the Monterey Pop Festival. Immediately after the festival, Bill Graham booked them for a series of five concerts at the Fillmore. While they were in California, Chandler booked session time for June 28, 29 and 30 at Houston Studios in Los Angeles. Although they worked on "Burning of the Midnight Lamp" and a new Hendrix composition, "The Stars That Play with Laughing Sam's Dice", they abandoned the inferior recordings. Chandler commented: "I booked three days there because I was told it was a state-of-the-art studio, but it was dire. The place was like a rehearsal studio compared to Olympic. Los Angeles was so far behind at that time." After a week of performances in Los Angeles and New York, time was booked at Mayfair Studios in London for July 6 and 7.

Axis: Bold As Love scheduled release date was almost delayed when Hendrix lost the master tape of side one of the LP, leaving it in the back seat of a London taxi. With the deadline looming, Hendrix, Chas Chandler, and engineer Eddie Kramer remixed most of side one in a single overnight session, but they could not match the quality of the lost mix of "If 6 Was 9". Bassist Noel Redding had a tape recording of this mix, which had to be smoothed out with an iron as it had gotten wrinkled. During the verses, Hendrix doubled his singing with a guitar line which he played one octave lower than his vocals. Hendrix voiced his disappointment about having re-mixed the album so quickly, and he felt that it could have been better had they been given more time.

Kramer was patient with Hendrix, who often demanded numerous re-takes; however, by October 1967, Chandler had grown weary of the guitarist's perfectionism. Noel Redding was also frustrated by Hendrix's repeated demands for re-takes, and began to resent Hendrix's explicit instructions regarding what he played in the studio. Hendrix and Mitchell had begun to express their opinions regarding creative choices that had been left up to Chandler during the recording of Are You Experienced. Mitchell commented: "Axis was the first time that it became apparent that Jimi was pretty good working behind the mixing board, as well as playing, and had some positive ideas of how he wanted things recorded. It could have been the start of any potential conflict between him and Chas in the studio."

Music and lyrics
The lyrics of "Spanish Castle Magic" were inspired by The Spanish Castle, a dance hall in what is now Des Moines, Washington near Seattle where Hendrix jammed with local rock groups during his high school years. On "Little Wing" Hendrix plays his guitar through a Leslie speaker for the first time (a revolving speaker which creates a wavering effect, that is typically used with electric organs). According to Colin Larkin, Axis focused less on guitar playing than the previous Experience album, and more on Hendrix's "gifts as a songwriter". Author Charles Shaar Murray described Axis as "lighter, looser and more melodic" than its predecessor.

Axis: Bold as Love opens with "EXP", which incorporates microphonic and harmonic feedback. It also showcased an experimental stereo panning effect in which sounds emanating from Hendrix's guitar move through the stereo image, revolving around the listener. The piece reflected his growing interest in science fiction and outer space. Author Keith Shadwick described the track as "some of the wildest music Hendrix ever released".

"Wait Until Tomorrow" is a pop song with an R&B guitar riff and Mitchell and Redding singing backing vocals. The fifth track, "Ain't No Telling", is a rock song with a complex structure despite its short length. Hendrix said that "Little Wing" was his impression of the Monterey Pop Festival put into the form of a girl. "If 6 Was 9", the last song on side one, is the album's longest track; some of the percussive effects were created by Gary Leeds (from the Walker Brothers) and Graham Nash stomping their feet.

"You Got Me Floatin'", a rock song opening with a swirling backwards guitar solo, opens the second side of the album. Roy Wood and Trevor Burton from the Move, who toured with Hendrix on a package tour through Britain during winter 1967, supplied backing vocals. According to Wood, he and Burton were in the studio next door while the song was being recorded, and Redding came by and asked them if they would like to sing on it. The following track, "Castles Made of Sand", is a ballad that also includes a backwards guitar solo. "She's So Fine", Redding's contribution to the album as a composer, a very British pop/rock Who-influenced piece, features Redding on lead vocals with help from Mitchell. "One Rainy Wish" begins as a ballad waltz, but develops a rock feel during the chorus that is in a different time signature from the verses.

The song "Little Miss Lover" has elements of funk, while the final song of the album, "Bold as Love", with an extended guitar solo at the end, closes out the album. In 2004, Rolling Stone ranked "Little Wing" number 357 in its list of the 500 Greatest Songs of All Time.

Hendrix composed the album's title track and finale around two verses and two choruses, during which he pairs emotions with personas, comparing them to colors. The song's coda features the first recording of stereo phasing. Numerous attempts at a basic rhythm track were undertaken before a satisfactory one was achieved on the 27th take. Shadwick described the composition as "possibly the most ambitious piece on Axis, the extravagant metaphors of the lyrics suggesting a growing confidence" in Hendrix's songwriting. His guitar playing throughout the song is marked by chordal arpeggios and contrapuntal motion, with tremolo-picked partial chords providing the musical foundation for the chorus, which culminates in what musicologist Andy Aledort described as "simply one of the greatest electric guitar solos ever played". The track fades out on tremolo-picked thirty-second note double stops. In 2011, Guitar World ranked the track number 24 in a list of Hendrix's 100 greatest performances.

Artwork and packaging
The album cover depicts Hendrix and the Experience as various forms of Vishnu, incorporating a painting of the musicians by Roger Law, from a photo-portrait by Karl Ferris. Melody Maker journalist Nick Jones described the artwork as a "beautiful fold out package" that compensated for the "very poor presentation" of Are You Experienced. Likening the design to the cover image on the Beatles' recent Sgt. Pepper's Lonely Hearts Club Band, he said it showed Hendrix "with a lot of freaky looking Indian cats and gods, sages and one guy with an elephant's trunk for a nose or something!"

Hendrix expressed dismay at the choice of cover art. He stated that the cover would have been more appropriate had it highlighted his Native American heritage. The painted image of the Experience was then superimposed on top of a copy of a mass-produced religious poster. Hendrix commented: "The three of us have nothing to do with what's on the Axis cover." Unlike the previous album's cover art, both the UK and US editions featured the same image. 

Some Hindus have since expressed anger over the use of religious images for the album's artwork. The Malaysian government's Home Ministry instituted a ban on the album's art in response to complaints.

Release and reception

Track released Axis: Bold as Love in the UK on December 1, 1967, where it peaked at number five and spent 16 weeks on the charts. In February 1968, it charted at number three in the United States. The album was also well received by music critics, who praised its mixture of hard rock, rhythm and blues, and jazz.

In his preview of the album for Rolling Stone, Nick Jones described it as "at times shatteringly beautiful" and highlighted "Spanish Castle Magic".
Reviewing Axis in the same publication, Jim Miller hailed it as "the refinement of white noise into psychedelia... the finest voodoo album that any rock group has produced to date". Q magazine wrote in a retrospective review that the album "dazzles as the Experience creates a genre probably short-lived because nobody else could play it". AllMusic's Cub Koda considered it a demonstration of Hendrix's "remarkable growth and depth" as a songwriter, utilizing Curtis Mayfield-like soul guitar work, "Dylanesque lyrical imagery, and Fuzz Face hyperactivity to produce yet another side to his grand psychedelic musical vision". According to author Peter Doggett, the record "heralded a new subtlety in Hendrix's work", while BBC Music's Chris Jones said it is distinguished from his other Hendrix albums as his "coming-of-age-in-songwriting album... his peak in crafting pop rock perfection".

Critics also found Axis: Bold as Love to be the least memorable of the Experience's three studio releases. According to Richie Unterberger, it was the least impressive from the Experience, while Kris Needs called the record a "transitional, but often overlooked, masterpiece". Reviewing Hendrix's back catalogue in 2005 for Blender, Robert Christgau acknowledged the adequate production and guitar quality on the album, and praised the fluidity of Mitchell's drumming; he criticised, however, the music's "spaced-out lightness", and the brevity of some tracks: "half the songs are forgettable as songs if fine as recordings."

In 2000, it was voted number 147 in Colin Larkin's All Time Top 1000 Albums. Rolling Stone ranked Axis: Bold as Love number 92 on its 2020 list of the 500 greatest albums of all time. It also received the top spot on their list of the 40 greatest stoner albums in 2013. Guitarist magazine named the album number 7 on their list of "the most influential guitar albums of all time". In 2015, Consequence of Sound described the album as a "compelling psychedelic masterpiece". The album is also included in the book 1001 Albums You Must Hear Before You Die.

Track listing
The original UK Track and US Reprise albums did not list running times for the songs. Instead, they are taken from the Reprise monaural promotional album. All songs written by Jimi Hendrix, except where noted.

Personnel

The Jimi Hendrix Experience 
 Jimi Hendrix – vocals, electric guitar, piano, recorder, glockenspiel on "Little Wing", voice of Mr. Paul Caruso on "EXP"
 Mitch Mitchell – drums, backing vocals, interviewer on "EXP"
 Noel Redding – bass guitars (four- and eight-string), backing vocals, foot stomping on "If 6 Was 9", lead vocals on "She's So Fine"

Additional personnel 
 Gary Leeds – foot stamping on "If 6 Was 9"
 Graham Nash – foot stamping on "If 6 Was 9", backing vocals on "You Got Me Floatin'"
 Trevor Burton – backing vocals on "You Got Me Floatin'"
 Roy Wood – backing vocals on "You Got Me Floatin'"

Production 
 Chas Chandler – producer, foot stomping on "If 6 Was 9"
 Eddie Kramer – chief engineer
 George Chkiantz, Andy Johns and Terry Brown – engineers
 Cover art – David King, Roger Law, painted heads based on a Karl Ferris group portrait (front)
 Donald Silverstein – photography (UK inner portrait)

Charts and certifications

Notes and references 
Footnotes

Citations

Sources
 
 
 
 
 
 
 
 
 
 
 
 
 
 
 
 
 
 
 
 
 
 
 
 

Further reading
 
 
 
 
 
 
 
 
 
 
 
 
 
 
 
 
 
 

Documentaries

External links
 Information about The Spanish Castle, a legendary Seattle-area dance hall where Jimi Hendrix gave some of his earliest performances
 More information about The Spanish Castle and Jimi Hendrix's early days

1967 albums
The Jimi Hendrix Experience albums
Track Records albums
Albums produced by Chas Chandler
Albums recorded at Olympic Sound Studios
Barclay (record label) albums
MCA Records albums
Polydor Records albums
Reprise Records albums
Obscenity controversies in music